Three ships of the Royal Australian Navy have been named HMAS Anzac, after the Australian and New Zealand Army Corps (ANZAC).

, a Parker-class destroyer leader commissioned into the Royal Navy as HMS Anzac and presented to the Australian Government in 1919. The ship was paid off in 1931, and sunk as a target four years later.
, a Battle-class destroyer commissioned in 1951. The ship was paid off in 1974, and sold for scrap.
, the lead ship of the Anzac-class of frigates. The frigate was commissioned in 1996, and is active as of 2016.

Battle honours
Five battle honours have been awarded to ships named HMAS Anzac:
 Korea 1951–53
 Malaya 1956
 East Timor 1999
 Persian Gulf 2001–03
 Iraq 2003

See also

References

Royal Australian Navy ship names